William David Maginnes (1893-1981) was a professional American football player. He played in the National Football League in 1921 with the New York Brickley Giants. Brickley's New York Giants are not related to the modern-day New York Giants. While with the Giants, Dave was teammates with his brother Al.

Notes

1893 births
1981 deaths
Players of American football from Massachusetts
American football running backs
New York Brickley Giants players
Lehigh Mountain Hawks football players